The following is a list of programs broadcast by Disney Channel (Brazil). It does not include Disney XD, or Disney Junior programs. All programs are dubbed in Portuguese.

Current programming

Former programming

Disney Junior

References

External links
 Official website

Children's television networks
Television channels and stations established in 2001
Portuguese-language television stations
Lists of television series by network
Disney Channel related-lists